Carnifex literally means butcher in Latin and in the history of ancient Rome refers to an executioner. The term was used as a nickname for the Roman general Gnaeus Pompeius Strabo, and his son Pompey was called adulescentulus carnifex 'teenage executioner'

It may also refer to:

Species

Abropus carnifex, a species of ground beetle in the monotypic genus Abropus
Cardisoma carnifex, a species of terrestrial crab
Dendropsophus carnifex, a species of frog
Metius carnifex, a species of ground beetle
Metoecis carnifex, a species of snout moth
Phoenicircus carnifex, the Guianan red cotinga, a species of bird
Polistes carnifex, a species of wasp
Pyrausta carnifex, a species of moth
Thylacoleo carnifex, the marsupial lion, an extinct carnivorous mammal species
Triturus carnifex, the Italian crested newt
Xenobolus carnifex, a species of millipede

Other uses
Carnifex, a novel by Tom Kratman
 Carnifex, a unit fielded by the Tyranid faction in the Warhammer 40,000 setting
Carnifex (band), an American deathcore band
Carnifex (film), 2022 Australian horror thriller starring Alexandra Park (actress)
Carnifex (Wild Cards), a character created by John J. Miller for the Wild Cards series of Science Fiction anthologies

See also
Battle of Carnifex Ferry
Carnifex Ferry Battlefield State Park